The Roman Catholic Diocese of Bengbu is a Latin rite suffragan diocese in the Ecclesiastical province of Anqing in eastern China, yet depends on the missionary Roman Congregation for the Evangelization of Peoples.

Its episcopal see is a cathedral in the city of Bengbu 蚌埠, Anhui province. It is vacant, without apostolic administrator since 2005.

No recent statistics available.

History 
 Established on 21 February 1929 as Apostolic Vicariate of Bengbu 蚌埠, on territory split off from the Apostolic Vicariate of Wuhu 蕪湖
 11 April 1946: Promoted as Diocese of Bengbu 蚌埠 / Pengpu / Pampuven(sis) (Latin adjective)

Episcopal ordinaries
(all Roman rite)

Apostolic Vicars of Bengbu 蚌埠 (Roman Rite)
 Tommaso Berutti, Jesuit Order (S.J.) (Italian) (19 December 1929 – retired 1933), Titular Bishop of Cusæ (1929.12.19 – death 1975.01.21)
 Cipriano Cassini, S.J. (Italian) (15 January 1937 – 11 April 1946 see below), Titular Bishop of Drivastum (1936.12.23 – 1946.04.11)

Suffragan Bishops of Bengbu 蚌埠 
 Cipriano Cassini, S.J. (see above 11 April  1946 – 11 June 1951)
 uncanonical : Zhou Yi-zhai (周益齋) (1958 without papal mandate – death 1983.10.26)
 Joseph Zhu Hua-yu (朱化宇) (1986 – 2001), also Apostolic Administrator of Archdiocese of Anqing 安慶 (China) (1997 – 2001), Apostolic Administrator of Wuhu 蕪湖 (China) (1997 – 2005.02.26); later Metropolitan Archbishop of above Anqing 安慶 (2001 – 2005.02.26)
Apostolic Administrator Father Xu Qin-zhong, S.J. (1997 – 2005), no other prelature.

See also 

 List of Catholic dioceses in China

Sources and external links 
 GCatholic.org - data for all sections
 Catholic Hierarchy

Roman Catholic dioceses in China
Anqing
Christianity in Anhui
Christian organizations established in 1929
Roman Catholic dioceses and prelatures established in the 20th century
1929 establishments in China